Jeanetta can refer to:

 Jeanetta, Houston, Texas
 Jeanetta, a variation of the given name Jeanette